August Heitmann (1907 in Kalymnos – 1971 in Santiago de Chile) was a German swimmer who competed in the 1928 Summer Olympics.

References

1907 births
1971 deaths
People from Kalymnos
German male swimmers
German male freestyle swimmers
Olympic swimmers of Germany
Swimmers at the 1928 Summer Olympics
European Aquatics Championships medalists in swimming
German emigrants to Chile
20th-century German people